Edwin James Morcom (17 May 1917 – 20 August 2007) was an Australian rules footballer who played with North Melbourne in the Victorian Football League (VFL).

Morcoms's career at North Melbourne was interrupted by his service in the Australian Army during World War II, where he served in Palestine and Greece.

Notes

External links 

Eddie Morcom's playing statistics from The VFA Project

1917 births
2007 deaths
Australian rules footballers from Victoria (Australia)
North Melbourne Football Club players
Brunswick Football Club players